MVP is the second studio album by French rapper and comedian Mister V, released 31 January 2020. The name "MVP" signifies "Most Valuable Panda" according to Mister V; the original term "MVP" means "Most Valuable Player" in sports. A reissue titled MVP (Réédition) was released on 15 January 2021.

Track listing 
Credits adapted from the album's track listing on Tidal.

Charts

Weekly charts

Certifications

See also
 List of number-one hits of 2020 (France)
 List of number-one hits of 2021 (France)

References 

2020 albums
Hip hop albums by French artists